Eucalyptus lucens, commonly known as the shiny-leaved mallee, is a species of mallee that is endemic to northwestern Australia. It has small, pale greyish to brown bark, glistening, lance-shaped adult leaves, flower buds in groups of seven on a branching peduncle, creamy white flowers and conical fruit.

Description
It has smooth pale grey to brownish bark, but often with some rough, fibrous or flaky bark near the base. Flowering occurs between December and March and the flowers are creamy white.

This eucalypt is a comparatively rare species but is conspicuous due to its glistening leaves, contrasting with those of the few other eucalypts growing in similar areas.

Taxonomy and naming
Eucalyptus lucens was first formally described in 1978 by Ian Brooker and Clyde Dunlop from a specimen collected by Dunlop on Mount Sonder in 1973. The description was published in the journal Australian Forest Research. The specific epithet (lucens) is a Latin word meaning "shining", "glistening" or "polished", referring to the shining leaves.

Distribution and habitat
Shiny-leaved mallee grows in open shrubland on shallow soils on sandstone and quartzite hills, mainly on the ranges west of Alice Springs in the northern Territory, but also in the Pilbara region of Western Australia.

Conservation status
This mallee is classified as "Priority One" in Western Australia, by the Government of Western Australia Department of Parks and Wildlife, meaning that it is known from only one or a few locations which are potentially at risk.

See also
List of Eucalyptus species

References

Eucalypts of Western Australia
lucens
Myrtales of Australia
Plants described in 1978
Mallees (habit)
Taxa named by Ian Brooker